Joseph Adolphe Rovan (born Joseph Adolph Rosenthal in Munich, Germany on  July 25, 1918, died July 27, 2004), was a French philosopher and politician, and is considered a spiritual father of post-war Europe. Initially born into the Jewish faith, on Whitsunday 1944 he was received into the Catholic Church.

Rovan was active in the French Resistance during World War II and was awarded the Croix de Guerre and the Médaille de la Résistance for his services. In 1944, he was arrested by the Gestapo and survived 10 months in the Dachau concentration camp. It was during this time that he converted to Catholicism. In 1945, after his return to France, he wrote in the magazine Esprit the article "L'Allemagne de nos mérites," where he suggested that the creation of a democratic Germany on the ruins of the Third Reich was the responsibility of the Allies.

Rovan has also been awarded the Legion d'Honneur, the Ordre National du Mérite, the German Order of Merit with Star, and the Bavarian Order of Merit. He died in a swimming accident in France.

External links 
 Telegraph Obituary Joseph Rovan

1918 births
2004 deaths
Accidental deaths in France
Deaths by drowning in France
20th-century German Jews
20th-century French philosophers
Jews in the French resistance
French Roman Catholics
Recipients of the Legion of Honour
Recipients of the Croix de Guerre 1939–1945 (France)
Recipients of the Resistance Medal
Recipients of the Ordre national du Mérite
Recipients of the Order of Merit of the Federal Republic of Germany
Recipients of the Order of Merit of Baden-Württemberg
Sport deaths in France
Lycée Carnot alumni
French male non-fiction writers
Winners of the Prix Broquette-Gonin (literature)
Converts to Roman Catholicism from Judaism
20th-century French male writers